Stuart David Whitehead (born 17 July 1976) is an English former footballer. He played as a right-back or centre-back.

Career
Born in Bromsgrove, Whitehead began his career at his hometown club Bromsgrove Rovers. After a season with the club, he joined then-Premiership Bolton Wanderers in 1995 on a free transfer.

Bolton were relegated in his first season with them, but won promotion back to the Premier League in the following season. After another top-flight season, Bolton and Whitehead parted company, with Whitehead never appearing for the club.

A regular starting role at Carlisle United followed, with Carlisle spending the whole period near the bottom of the Football League. He appeared in the famous Jimmy Glass game against Plymouth Argyle, in which the goalkeeper scored in the 94th minute to keep Carlisle United in the Football League. A ten-month spell at Darlington followed before Whitehead dropped down to the Football Conference in August 2003 for a season with Telford United. Telford, and their chairman, were to go bankrupt at the end of the season, so Whitehead made the short move to newly promoted (to League Two) Shrewsbury Town.

In his two seasons with the club, Whitehead became Shrewsbury's first-choice right-back, making 70 appearances for the Shropshire club. However, on 14 April 2006 he was released by Shrewsbury to allow the emergence of Gavin Cadwallader. Whitehead agreed to join Conference club Kidderminster Harriers on a two-year contract in the summer of 2006.

In his first season Whitehead played well and was a vital part of the FA Trophy run to the finals. He led the team out on 12 May hoping to lift the trophy but, unfortunately he will go down in history as the first captain to lose a competitive match at Wembley.

Whitehead left Kidderminster by mutual consent on 31 January 2008 and subsequently made his return to the New Bucks Head, signing an 18-month deal with Conference North side AFC Telford United.

At the start of the 2008/2009 season, Whitehead was named as the new AFC Telford United captain. At the end of the 2009/2010 season, following the dismissal of Rob Smith, Whitehead was named caretaker manager for Telford's final game of the season, a 3–1 defeat away to Vauxhall Motors. He left Telford in January 2012, joining Worcester City the next day.

References

External links

1976 births
Living people
Sportspeople from Bromsgrove
Association football fullbacks
Association football central defenders
Bromsgrove Rovers F.C. players
Bolton Wanderers F.C. players
Carlisle United F.C. players
Darlington F.C. players
Telford United F.C. players
Shrewsbury Town F.C. players
Kidderminster Harriers F.C. players
AFC Telford United players
English Football League players
National League (English football) players
Worcester City F.C. players
English footballers